Lile may refer to:

 Lile (fish), a genus of fish
 Adam Lile, New Zealand rugby player
 Jimmy Lile (1933–1991), American knifemaker
 Robert Lile, defendant of the United States Supreme Court case McKune v. Lile
 Lile Gibbons, 21st century American politician and businesswoman
 Lile, West Virginia, United States, an unincorporated community
 LILE, ICAO airport code for Biella-Cerrione Airport, Cerrione, Italy
  LILE, large-ion lithophile elements

See also
 Lyle (disambiguation)
 Liles, a surname